Peyo Boichinov is a Bulgarian male badminton player. In 2016, he became the runner-up of the Hellas International tournament in men's doubles event.

Achievements

BWF International Challenge/Series
Men's Doubles

 BWF International Challenge tournament
 BWF International Series tournament
 BWF Future Series tournament

References

External links
 
 

Living people
Year of birth missing (living people)
Place of birth missing (living people)
Bulgarian male badminton players
21st-century Bulgarian people